Belvoir Township is a township in Pitt County, North Carolina, United States. The population was 9,334 at the 2010 census.  The township is a part of the Greenville Metropolitan Area located in North Carolina's Inner Banks region. It includes the census-designated place of Belvoir, North Carolina.

Geography
Belvoir is located at latitude 35.708 and longitude -77.465.

Demographics
As of the census of 2010, there were 9,334 people living in the township.  The racial makeup of the town was 30.7% White, 51.5% African American, 0.5% American Indian or Alaska Native, 0.4% Asian, 0.3% Native Hawaiian or other Pacific Islander, 13.5% from some other race, and 3.1% from two or more races. Hispanic or Latino of any race were 19.3% of the population.

In the town the population was spread out, with 30.3% under the age of 18, 9.4% from 18 to 24, 27.5% from 25 to 44, 24.5% from 45 to 64, and 8.3% who were 65 years of age or older. The median age was 32.4 years. Males made up 48.8% of the population, and females made up 51.2%.

At the 2000 census, the median income for a household in the town was $36,149, and the median income for a family was $46,549.

References

Townships in Pitt County, North Carolina
Greenville, North Carolina metropolitan area
Townships in North Carolina